The 1976 Daytona 500, the 18th running of the event, happened on Feb. 15th, 1976 at Daytona International Speedway, Daytona Beach, Fl. It is remembered for the late-race duel and accident between David Pearson and Richard Petty. Many fans consider this finish to be the greatest in the history of NASCAR. The end of the race was televised live on American network ABC.

These were the first Daytona 500 starts for Neil Bonnett, Terry Ryan, Salt Walther, D. K. Ulrich, Roy Smith, Jimmy Lee Capps, Skip Manning, Tighe Scott, Dick May, and Jimmy Means.  For Terry Bivins, Johnny Ray, Dr. Dick Skillen, David Hobbs, and Tom Williams, this would be their only Daytona 500 start. Joe Frasson, Jackie Rogers, David Sisco, and Earl Ross would make their last Daytona 500s this year.

Qualifying
USAC stock car racer Ramo Stott won his only career NASCAR pole position. There was a major speed discrepancy between cars in their qualification runs. Two of the teams who qualified in the  range were disqualified after NASCAR inspectors found suspicious extra fuel lines. Some teams attributed these lines to performance-enhancing nitrous oxide. One driver later admitted that he deliberately qualified slower to let the time from "offending" teams stick out.

In the 125-mile qualifying races, Dave Marcis won race 1, while Darrell Waltrip claimed race 2.

Race
The opening laps were a battle for the lead between Buddy Baker, Waltrip, and David Pearson. A. J. Foyt rocketed from the rear to lead 68 laps before falling out with engine failure.   
An accident on lap 112 involving Johnny Ray and Skip Manning ended Ray's racing career.

Late in the race, Richard Petty and David Pearson were nose-to-tail, two laps ahead of all other competitors. On the final lap, Pearson passed Petty on the backstretch, and Petty attempted to re-pass in turn 3. Petty did not completely clear Pearson and the two cars made contact with each other and the wall, sending them spinning into the infield grass, just yards from the finish line. Petty's car stalled and would not re-fire. Pearson re-started his stricken car and crossed the finish line to win. Petty, with the help of a push-start from his crew, crossed the line for 2nd.

Box Score
Margin of victory: 50 yards

(5) Indicates 5 bonus points added to normal race points scored for leading 1 lap(10) Indicates 10 bonus points added to normal race points scored for leading 1 lap & leading the most lapsNote: A.J. Foyt led the most laps but was not eligible for NASCAR points.

Failed to qualify, withdrew, or driver changes

Caution flags
7 for 35 laps

Percent of race run under caution: 14.5%Average green flag run: 24.4 laps

Lap leader breakdown
Lead changes: 36

Standings after the race

References

NASCAR races at Daytona International Speedway
Daytona 500
Daytona 500
Daytona 500